Iron Cay is an uninhabited cay of the Bahamas in the Central Abaco district.

It is home of the Bahaman anole

References

Islands of the Bahamas
Uninhabited islands of the Bahamas